NA-218 Tando Allahyar is a constituency for the National Assembly of Pakistan.

Members of Parliament

2018-2022: NA-224 Tando Allahyar

Election 2002 

General elections were held on 10 Oct 2002. Abdul Sattar Bachani of PPP won by 50,624 votes.

Election 2008 

General elections were held on 18 Feb 2008. Abdul Sattar Bachani of PPP won by 84,669 votes.

Election 2013 

General elections were held on 11 May 2013. Abdul Sattar Bachani of PPP won by 91,956 votes and became the  member of National Assembly.

Election 2018 

General elections were held on 25 July 2018.

See also
NA-217 Matiari
NA-219 Hyderabad-I

References

External links 
Election result's official website

NA-223